Hunter and the Dog Star is the fifth studio album by Edie Brickell & New Bohemians, released in 2021.

Reception
Writing for American Songwriter, Lee Zimmerman gave the album four out of five stars, and called it a "remarkably uplifting effort". In Forbes, Steve Baltin described it as "stellar" and "a smart, highly literate, enjoyable song cycle that goes on a full journey".

Track listing
"Sleeve"
"Don't Get in the Bed Dirty"
"I Don't Know"
"Stubborn Love"
"Rough Beginnings"
"Tripwire"
"Horse's Mouth"
"I Found You"
"Miracles"
"Evidence"
"My Power"

References

External links
 
 

Edie Brickell & New Bohemians albums
2021 albums